Al-Jāmiʿah al-Islāmiyyah al-Ibrāhīmiyyah, also known simply as Jamia Islamia Ibrahimia and popularly as the Ujani Madrassah, is a Qawmi jamia in Kachua upazila of Chandpur. It was established in 1901 by Qari Ibrahim Ujani, a student of Rashid Ahmad Gangohi.

Management
Based on the principle of Darul Uloom Deoband, the jamia has been offering religious education on the basis of the help and support of the Muslim community. The activities if the jamia are executed under the leadership of principal through Majlish-e Shura and Majlish-e Aamela.

Education system
Jamia Islamia Ibrahimia Ujani offers Islamic education from the initial level up to the highest level. The educational activities of the jamia are being conducted under the Qawmi Madrasah Education Board Befaqul Madarisil Arabia Bangladesh. The madrasa has the following dept.s of higher education.
 Dept of Hadith
 Dept of Qiraat
 Dept of Fatwa
This madrasa has got special fame across the country for the Qiraat Dept.

See also
 Al-Jamiatul Arabia Haildhar Madrasa
 Al-Haiatul Ulya Lil-Jamiatil Qawmia Bangladesh
 Nurul Islam Olipuri
 Muhibbullah Babunagari

References

Qawmi madrasas of Bangladesh
Deobandi Islamic universities and colleges
1901 establishments in India